Scott's Store is a historic commercial building located near Bridgeville, Sussex County, Delaware.  It was built about 1875, and is a two-story, rectangular, frame structure in a simplified Victorian Gothic style.  It sits on a brick foundation, is sheathed in weatherboard, and a gable roof.  The storefront has a pair of double doors and there is the large one-story, hipped porch roof extending across the face of the building. Also on the property are a contributing garage and outhouse, and a submerged round metal tank used to mix carbide gas.  It is typical of the no longer numerous 19th-century country stores of southern Delaware.

It was added to the National Register of Historic Places in 1983.

References

Commercial buildings on the National Register of Historic Places in Delaware
Gothic Revival architecture in Delaware
Commercial buildings completed in 1875
Buildings and structures in Sussex County, Delaware
National Register of Historic Places in Sussex County, Delaware
1875 establishments in Delaware